Claudia Sheinbaum Pardo (born 24 June 1962) is a Mexican scientist, politician, and head of government of Mexico City, a position equivalent to a state governor. She was elected on 1 July 2018 as part of the Juntos Haremos Historia coalition. She is the second woman and the first Jew to be elected to this position in Mexico City.

Sheinbaum has a Ph.D. in energy engineering, and is the author of over 100 articles and two books on the topics of energy, the environment, and sustainable development. She served as the Secretary of the Environment of Mexico City from 2000 to 2006 during Andrés Manuel López Obrador's term as mayor, and she was the Mayor of Tlalpan from 2015 to 2017. She contributed to the Intergovernmental Panel on Climate Change, which received the Nobel Peace Prize in 2007. In 2018, she was listed as one of BBC's 100 Women. Sheinbaum has been widely mentioned as a possible candidate in the 2024 presidential election.

Early life 
Claudia Sheinbaum Pardo was born to a secular Jewish family in Mexico City. Her father's Ashkenazi parents emigrated from Lithuania to Mexico City in the 1920s; her mother's Sephardic parents emigrated there from Sofia, Bulgaria, in the early 1940s to escape the Holocaust. She celebrated all the Jewish holidays at her grandparents' homes. Both of her parents are scientists: her father, chemical engineer Carlos Sheinbaum Yoselevitz, and her mother, Annie Pardo Cemo, a biologist, professor emeritus of the Faculty of Sciences at the National Autonomous University of Mexico. Her brother is a physicist.

Academic career 
Sheinbaum studied physics at the National Autonomous University of Mexico (UNAM), where she earned an undergraduate degree ('89), followed by a master's ('94) and a Ph.D. ('95) in energy engineering. She completed the work for her doctoral thesis in four years (1991–94) at the Lawrence Berkeley National Laboratory in Berkeley, California, where she analyzed the use of energy in Mexico's transportation, published studies on the trends of Mexican building energy use, and obtained a Ph.D. in energy engineering and physics.

In 1995 she joined the faculty at UNAM's Institute of Engineering. She was a researcher at the Institute of Engineering and is a member of both the Sistema Nacional de Investigadores and the Mexican Academy of Sciences. In 1999 she received the prize of best UNAM young researcher in engineering and technological innovation.

In 2006 Sheinbaum returned to UNAM, after a period in government, publishing articles in scientific journals.

In 2007, she joined the Intergovernmental Panel on Climate Change (IPCC) at the United Nations in the field of energy and industry, as a contributing co-author on the topic "Mitigation of climate change" for the IPCC Fourth Assessment Report. The group won the Nobel Peace Prize that year. In 2013, she co-authored the IPCC Fifth Assessment Report alongside 11 other experts in the field of industry.

Early political career 
During her time as a student at the National Autonomous University of Mexico, she was a member of the Consejo Estudiantil Universitario (University Student Council), a group of students that would become the founding youth movement of the Mexican Party of the Democratic Revolution (PRD).

She was the Secretary of the Environment of Mexico City from 5 December 2000, having been appointed on 20 November 2000 to the cabinet of the Head of Government of Mexico City Andrés Manuel López Obrador. During her term, which concluded in May 2006, she was responsible for the construction of an electronic vehicle-registration center for Mexico City. She also oversaw the introduction of the Metrobus, a rapid transit bus with dedicated lanes, and the construction of the second story of the Anillo Periférico, Mexico City's ring road.

López Obrador included Sheinbaum in his proposed cabinet for the Secretariat of Environment and Natural Resources as part of his campaign for the 2012 Mexican general election. In 2014 she joined Lopez Obrador's splinter movement which broke away from the mainstream Mexican left-wing party, the Party of the Democratic Revolution. She served as Secretary of the Environment in 2015.

Mayor of Tlalpan
From the end of 2015, Sheinbaum served as the Mayor of Tlalpan. She resigned from the position upon receiving the nomination for candidacy of the mayor of Mexico City for the Juntos Haremos Historia (Together We Will Make History) coalition, consisting of the National Regeneration Movement (MORENA), the Labor Party (PT), and the Social Encounter Party (PES).

Mayor of Mexico City

On 1 July 2018, Sheinbaum was elected to a six-year term as the head of the government of the Federal District of Mexico City, defeating six other candidates. During the campaign, Sheinbaum was accused by the PAN of being responsible for the collapse of an elementary school in a 7.1 level earthquake that killed 19 children in 2017. She became both Mexico City's first elected female mayor, and its first Jewish mayor.

Tenure 
In June 2019, Sheinbaum announced a new six-year environmental plan. It includes reducing air pollution by 30%, planting 15 million trees, banning single-use plastics and promoting recycling, building a new waste separation plant, providing water service to every home, constructing 100 kilometers of corridors for the exclusive use of trolleybus lines and the Mexico City Metrobús system, and constructing and installing solar water heaters and solar panels.

In September 2019, Sheinbaum announced a 40 billion peso (US$2 billion) investment to modernize the Mexico City Metro over the next five years, including modernization, re-strengthening, new trains, improving stations, stairways, train control and automation, user information, and payment systems.

Sheinbaum was nominated by the City Mayors Foundation for the World Mayor prize in 2021 in North America for her handling of the COVID-19 pandemic in Mexico.

2021 Metro Line 12 disaster 
On 3 May 2021, a train was traveling on Mexico City Metro Line 12, when a girder supporting the overpass on which the train was traveling collapsed, killing 26 and injuring more than 70. Some critics said Sheinbaum and other leaders should have worked harder to improve the Metro's infrastructure. Some political observers have suggested that the political fallout from the crash may harm Sheinbaum's potential candidacy in the 2024 presidential election.

Personal life 
In 1986, Sheinbaum met politician Carlos Ímaz Gispert, to whom she was married from 1987 to 2016. She has one daughter from this marriage (Mariana, born in 1988, who in 2019 was studying for a doctorate in philosophy at the University of California at Santa Cruz), and also became stepmother to Rodrigo Ímaz Alarcón (born in 1982; now a filmmaker).

During the COVID-19 pandemic in Mexico, Sheinbaum tested positive for COVID-19 on 27 October 2020, but was asymptomatic.

Controversies

Demolition of a chapel in the Colonia Cultura Maya, Tlalpan 
On 29 April 2016, when Claudia Sheinbaum was Delegational Chief of Tlalpan, staff of that Delegation, authorized by the deputy director of the Legal Bureau and Government, José Edwin Cerón, demolished the Capilla del Señor de los Trabajos (Chapel of the Lord of the Works), a shed with a metal sheet roof that parishioners had placed years ago, on a piece of land located between Tapakan and Yobain Streets, in the Colonia Cultura Maya of the abovementioned Delegation of Mexico City and dependent on the parish temple of the Sacred Heart of Jesus, in charge of the parish priest Juan Guillermo Blandón Pérez, who pointed out that Sheinbaum was responsible for the demolition: he commented that the action was carried out without prior notification. This last church is located one block away north of the chapel, by Hopelchén Street, in the same neighborhood.

In the same block as the chapel is the Maya Culture Community Center. Days after the demolition of the chapel, the then chief of the delegation, Claudia Sheinbaum, met with the bishop of the VI Vicariate of the Roman Catholic Archdiocese of Mexico, Monsignor Crispín Ojeda Márquez; Armando Martínez, president of the Universidad del Pedregal, and Manuel Santiago, general director of Works in the demarcation. They agreed to divide the property in half and build a chapel and an Arts and Crafts Center.

Enrique Rébsamen Private School 
Journalist Eduardo Ruiz-Healy has accused Claudia Sheinbaum, who was chief of the Tlalpan Delegation from 1 October 2015 to 6 December 2017, of opacity, not having delivered the complete file of the authorizations and permits for land use, construction, and approval of maintenance, security and operation of the property that the Enrique Rébsamen Private School occupied, and neither, on the expansion of the building located at 19 Rancho Tamboreo Street up until 19 September 2017, the day on which the 2017 Puebla earthquake occurred, which mainly affected Mexico City, Morelos, Puebla, Tlaxcala, and the State of Mexico. The earthquake caused the total or partial fall of numerous buildings, including a part of the estate occupied by the Enrique Rébsamen Private School, located at 11 Rancho Tamboreo Street, in Colonia Nueva Oriental Coapa, where 19 children and seven adults died, in Tlalpan, when the chief of that demarcation was Claudia Sheinbaum. In September 2016, during the Sheinbaum delegational government, the Institute for Administrative Verification ruled that the private school's building infringed on the use of land and exceeded the number of levels allowed, and denounced that the owner, Mónica García Villegas, had shown apocryphal documents. Enrique Fuentes, lawyer for the group "Angels against Impunity" (Ángeles contra la Impunidad), integrated by parents of the deceased children, pointed out that the Tlalpan Delegation was notified as a "third party involved." He said the delegational chief had an obligation to act, but abstained, allowing the school to continue activities.

Background 
On 31 August 1983, the Urban Planning Office of the Tlalpan Delegation, through the Construction Licensing Section, issued a construction permit on the land located at the address indicated above, for a Kindergarten school, two departments on four levels (the Enrique Rébsamen Private School), when the head of the Federal District Department was the Institutional Revolutionary Party member Ramón Aguirre Velázquez, and the delegational chief in Tlalpan, Guillermo Nieves Jenkin.

In 2014, after an earthquake of 7.2 magnitude, the architect and engineer Juan Mario Velarde Gámez, who presented himself as Director Responsible of the Construction [of the Enrique Rébsamen Private School], stated that the building had "the necessary equipment and security systems for emergency situations provided for in the Construction Regulations for the Federal District."

Collapse of Line 12 of the Mexico City Metro 
At around 10:22 p.m. on 3 May 2021, several girders, part of the tracks, and two wagons of Line 12 ("Golden Line") of the Mexico City Metro collapsed, between the Olivos and Tezonco metro stations, on Tláhuac Avenue, which in that area serves as the boundary between the Iztapalapa and Tláhuac boroughs. The casualties were 26 dead, 80 injured and five missing. Line 12 of the Mexico City Metro was inaugurated on 30 October 2012 by the then Head of Government of Mexico City, Marcelo Ebrard, and the then President of Mexico, Felipe Calderón.

From weeks before the inauguration, construction failures were detected, for which over more than three years it was necessary to suspend the transport service several times, re-shape some sections of tracks, replace rails, and give greater maintenance; most of these works were carried out during the term of Miguel Ángel Mancera as Head of the Government of Mexico City. On 4 May 2021, the Secretary of Foreign Affairs of Mexico, Marcelo Ebrard, said that the work was definitively delivered in July 2013, after reviews carried out for seven months, and expressed his willingness to respond and collaborate in the event of any request from the authorities.

The Norwegian company Det Norske Veritas (DNV), in charge of investigating the causes of the collapse of Metro Line 12 – on 3 May 2021 –, detected that one of the beams that collapsed already had structural failures since before the earthquake of 19 September 2017, a factor that had caused problems in the elevated section of the Line that collapsed. On 28 June 2021, the general director of the Mexico City Metro, who was appointed on 5 December 2018, was removed from her position by Sheinbaum. The editor of the Mexico City daily newspaper El Financiero, Alejo Sánchez Cano, considered that the responsibility of Sheinbaum is unavoidable, stating that after having been in office for two and a half years she was negligent by not maintaining the metro system.

Selected bibliography 
Sheinbaum is the author of over 100 articles and two books on the topics of energy, the environment, and sustainable development. A selection follows:

 Consumo de energía y emisiones de  del autotransporte en México y Escenarios de Mitigación, Ávila-Solís JC, Sheinbaum-Pardo C. 2016.
 Decomposition analysis from demand services to material production: The case of  emissions from steel produced for automobiles in Mexico, Applied Energy, 174: 245-255, Sheinbaum-Pardo C. 2016.
 The impact of energy efficiency standards on residential electricity consumption in Mexico, Energy for Sustainable Development, 32:50-61 Martínez-Montejo S.A., Sheinbaum-Pardo C. 2016.
 Science and Technology in the framework of the Sustainable Development Goals, World Journal of Science, Technology and Sustainable Development, 14:2 - 17. Imaz M. Sheinbaum C. 2017.
 Assessing the Impacts of Final Demand on -eq Emissions in the Mexican Economy: An Input-Output Analysis, Energy and Power Engineering, 9:40-54, Chatellier D, Sheinbaum C. 2017.
 Electricity sector reforms in four Latin-American countries and their impact on carbon dioxide emissions and renewable energy, Ruíz- Mendoza BJ, Sheinbaum-Pardo C. Energy Policy, 2010
 Energy consumption and related  emissions in five Latin American countries: Changes from 1990 to 2006 and perspectives, Sheinbaum C, Ruíz BJ, Ozawa L. Energy, 2010.
 Mitigating Carbon Emissions while Advancing National Development Priorities: The Case of Mexico, C Sheinbaum, O Masera, Climatic Change, Springer, 2000.
 Energy use and  emissions for Mexico's cement industry, C Sheinbaum, L Ozawa, Energy, Elsevier, 1998.
 Energy use and  emissions in Mexico's iron and steel industry, L Ozawa, C Sheinbaum, N Martin, E Worrell, L Price, Energy, Elsevier, 2002.
 New trends in industrial energy efficiency in the Mexico iron and steel industry, L Ozawa, N Martin, E Worrell, L Price, C Sheinbaum, OSTI, 1999.
 Mexican Electric end-use Efficiency: Experiences to Date, R Friedmann, C Sheinbaum, Annual Review of Energy and the Environment, 1998.
 Incorporating Sustainable Development Concerns into Climate Change Mitigation: A Case Study, OR Masera, C Sheinbaum, Climate Change and Development, UDLAP, 2000.

References

External links

 
 
 

1962 births
Living people
National Autonomous University of Mexico alumni
Academic staff of the National Autonomous University of Mexico
Lawrence Berkeley National Laboratory people
Members of the Mexican Academy of Sciences
Intergovernmental Panel on Climate Change contributing authors
20th-century Mexican engineers
Politicians from Mexico City
Party of the Democratic Revolution politicians
Morena (political party) politicians
Women mayors of places in Mexico
Mayors of places in Mexico
Jewish Mexican politicians
Mexican Ashkenazi Jews
Mexican Sephardi Jews
Mexican people of Bulgarian-Jewish descent
Mexican people of Lithuanian-Jewish descent
Heads of Government of Mexico City
Women governors of States of Mexico
BBC 100 Women
Jewish women politicians
21st-century Mexican scientists
Jewish women scientists
Mexican women physicists
Scientists from Mexico City
Women climatologists
Jewish mayors
21st-century Mexican engineers